Petru Kuki (born 22 May 1955) is a Romanian épée and foil fencer. He competed at the 1976, 1980 and 1984 Summer Olympics.

References

External links
 

1955 births
Living people
Romanian male épée fencers
Romanian male foil fencers
Olympic fencers of Romania
Fencers at the 1976 Summer Olympics
Fencers at the 1980 Summer Olympics
Fencers at the 1984 Summer Olympics
Universiade medalists in fencing
Sportspeople from Satu Mare
Universiade silver medalists for Romania
Medalists at the 1981 Summer Universiade